Pigeon Spire is a peak in the Purcell Mountains of the Columbia Mountains in southeastern British Columbia, Canada. It may be one of the most climbed of the spires in The Bugaboos owing to its relatively low prominence from the Vowell Glacier and the existence of an easy route (the West Ridge; II, 5.4). It is not uncommon to have a couple dozen people on this route on a busy weekend. There are longer, harder routes on the spire's North and East faces.

Routes 
 West Ridge (II, 5.4)

External links 
 Pigeon Spire at Bivouac.com

Three-thousanders of British Columbia
Columbia Valley
Purcell Mountains
Kootenay Land District